The Earring (Spanish:El Pendiente) is a 1951 Argentine thriller film directed by León Klimovsky and starring Mirtha Legrand. It is a film noir based on a story by Cornell Woolrich. The film's art direction was by Germán Gelpi and Mario Vanarelli.

Cast
 Graciliano
 María Esther Buschiazzo 
 Héctor Calcaño 
 Carlos Campagnale 
 Pina Castro
 José Cibrián 
 Francisco de Paula
 Raúl del Valle 
 Rafael Diserio
 Carmen Giménez 
 Eliseo Herrero 
 Mirtha Legrand as Hilda 
 Raúl Miller 
 Enrique Nunez

References

Bibliography
 Spicer, Andrew. Historical Dictionary of Film Noir. Scarecrow Press, 2010.

External links
 

1951 films
1950s Spanish-language films
Argentine black-and-white films
Films directed by León Klimovsky
Films based on works by Cornell Woolrich
Films scored by Julián Bautista
Argentine thriller films
1950s thriller films
1950s Argentine films